Vernon John Lanigan (4 September 1899 – 14 July 1972) was an Australian rules footballer who played with South Melbourne in the Victorian Football League (VFL).

Family
The son of John Lanigan (1977-1947), and Catherine Grace Lanigan (1877-1927), née Horstman, Vernon John Lanigan was born at Maffra on 4 September 1899.

He married Margaret Annie "Peggy" Barr, in Melbourne on 10 June 1939.

Death
He died at Box Hill, Victoria on 14 July 1972.

Notes

References

External links 

1899 births
1972 deaths
Australian rules footballers from Victoria (Australia)
Sydney Swans players
Maffra Football Club players
People educated at Xavier College